Nyctophila heydeni, the Balearic firefly, is a species of firefly. The species is present in the island of Mallorca where it could be an endemism.

References

External links
 Gusanos de luz. ¿Has visto una luciérnaga? 

Lampyridae
Bioluminescent insects
Beetles described in 1884
Beetles of Europe